Oblong Inc. (formerly Glowpoint, Inc.) is a cloud-based communication service provider. The company was founded in 1991 and its headquarter is in Denver, Colorado. It serves an enterprise customer base including about 600 customers, such as some Fortune 100 companies, governments and other profit and non-profit organizations. The company applies its core business platform, cloud-based OpenVideo platform, to deliver diverse services to customers. In 2011, its product, Virtual Visual Room, received 2011 NGN Leadership Award from NGN Magazine.

Background
The portfolio of the company’s products consists of OpenVideo, TeamCamHD & RemoteCamHD and Network service. OpenVideo is a platform built under safety protocols to support the communication of Integrated Services Digital Network (ISDN). The company cooperates with Tier 1 MPLS (Multi-Protocol Label Switching) providers, including Global Crossing, Masergy, Qwest, TATA, PCCW and Verizon Business to delivers its cloud-based platform services. Its competitor base includes Global Telecom & Technology, Inc., West Corp., EarthLink Inc., Hawaiian Telcom Holdco Inc., etc.

On Dec. 21, 2013, the company promoted an application of video collaboration developed by itself which connected singer Caroline Pennell from “The Voice” to bring cheer to the children at St. Joseph’s Hospital.

In March 2020, the company changed its name to Oblong Inc. following a merger with Oblong Industries.

References

External links
 

Software companies established in 1991
Companies listed on NYSE American
1991 establishments in Colorado